Emiliano Díaz Brienza (born 9 May 2002) is a Mexican professional footballer who plays as a forward for MLS Next Pro club Whitecaps FC 2. He has been called-up to the Canada under-17 national team but has never appeared for Canada.

Early life
Brienza was born in Puerto Vallarta, Mexico, with his family moving to Coquitlam, British Columbia in Canada in 2015 when he was 13-years old. He was part of the Mountain United FC team at club level before joining the Whitecaps FC Academy in September 2018. In 2019, Brienza started 18 matches with the under-17 team, including three playoff matches, scoring six goals. He also made three appearances with the under-19 team

Club career
On 25 February 2022, it was announced that Brienza had signed with Whitecaps FC 2, Vancouver's reserve team who would compete in the newly formed MLS Next Pro. It was also announced he would join the Vancouver Whitecaps FC MLS roster on a short-term deal. On 26 February, Brienza made his professional debut, appearing as an 88th-minute substitute during a 4–0 loss to Columbus Crew on the opening game of the season.

International career
Brienza was first called up to a Canada under-17 national camp for the 2019 FIFA U-17 World Cup. He appeared on the bench for three matches without making an appearance.

Career statistics

References

2002 births
Living people
Sportspeople of Mexican descent
Canadian people of Mexican descent
Mexican emigrants to Canada
Sportspeople from British Columbia
Canadian soccer players
Association football forwards
Canada men's youth international soccer players
Vancouver Whitecaps FC players
Whitecaps FC 2 players
Major League Soccer players
MLS Next Pro players